Trondheim International School ("This") was founded in 2004 as an alternative to the Norwegian schools. It became an IB World School in 2008. It sees the IB program as a continuation process from the "PYP" to the "MYP" to the "DP" programs, and therefore has a continuation process with communication with the IB Diploma Program in the Trondheim Cathedral School.

References

External links

 Official website 

International Baccalaureate schools in Norway
Educational institutions established in 2004
International schools in Norway
2004 establishments in Norway